Eagleville may refer to:

Places
United States
 Eagleville, California (disambiguation)
 Eagleville, Modoc County, California
 Eagleville, Yuba County, California
 Eagleville, Missouri
 Eagleville, Churchill County, Nevada
 Eagleville, Mineral County, Nevada
 Eagleville, Ashtabula County, Ohio
 Eagleville, Wood County, Ohio
 Eagleville, Centre County, Pennsylvania
 Eagleville, Montgomery County, Pennsylvania
 Eagleville, Tennessee
 Eagleville, Wisconsin